Sidhwan dona is a village in Kapurthala district, Punjab (India).  It is 13 km away from Kapurthala and 28 km from Jalandhar.  It has a population of about 4716 persons living in around 2500 households.

Villages in Kapurthala district